Robert Pruitt (born 1975) is a visual artist from Houston, Texas living in New York City who is known for his figurative drawings and who also works with sculpture, photography, and animation.

Early life 
Born in 1975 in Houston, TX, Pruitt grew up in Houston's Third and Fourth Wards, frequently in and around his family's funeral home, Pruitt and Pruitt. He earned a Bachelor of Arts from Texas Southern University in Houston, Texas in 2000 and Master of Fine Arts from the University of Texas at Austin in 2003. From 2004–2008, he was a curator at Project Row Houses.

Artistic career 

A participant in both the 2010 SITE Santa Fe Eighth International Biennial: The Dissolve and the 2006 Whitney Biennial: Day for Night, Pruitt was awarded residencies at the Tamarind Institute in Albuquerque, New Mexico in 2014 and 2015, the Bemis Center for Contemporary Arts in Omaha, Nebraska in 2015, Gallery MOMO in Johannesburg, South Africa in 2015, and The Joan Mitchell Center in New Orleans, Louisiana in 2016.

Otabenga Jones & Associates 
Pruitt is a founding member of the Houston artist collective, Otabenga Jones & Associates, alongside Dawolu Jabari Anderson, Jamal Cyrus, and Kenya Evans. Initially created in 2002, they worked in a studio underneath the Eldorado Ballroom and the name comes from Ota Benga, an African pygmy who in 1906 was put on display at the Bronx Zoo. A century later in 2006, all four members of the OBJA were individually selected for the Whitney Biennial, and the collective was chosen to participate as well. They follow in the legacy of John Biggers, who founded the art program at Texas Southern University, where the four associates met in 1994 in the drawing class taught by Harvey Johnson.

MF Problem 
Formed in 2012 in Houston with Autumn Knight, fellow artist and Pruitt's partner, the collective has been based in New York, New York since 2016. Together, they focus on "collaborative, conceptual, visual and performative strategies that critique the divisions of race, power, and inequalities found in national and global social structures. MF Problem creates artwork in response to their real life as an artist couple, as visionaries, and as black magicians, and as time travelers."

Selected Exhibition History 
 Day for Night, Whitney Biennial 2006, New York
 Lessons from Below: Otabenga Jones & Associates, 2007, The Menil Collection
 Robert Pruitt: Women, 2013, Studio Museum, Harlem, New York
 Robert Pruitt: Planetary Survey, 2017, Koplin Del Rio Gallery, Seattle
 Robert Pruitt: Benediction, 2017, Ulrich Museum of Art, Wichita State University, Wichita Kansas
 Robert Pruitt: Devotion, 2018–19, California African American Museum, Los Angeles
 The Majesty of Kings Long Dead, 2019, Koplin Del Rio Gallery, Seattle
 The Banner Project: Robert Pruitt, 2019–20, Museum of Fine Arts, Boston

Awards 
 The Arch and Anne Giles Kimbrough Fund Award, 1999
 Cultural Arts Council of Houston Award  Emerging Artist Grant, 1999
 Artadia Award, Houston, 2004
 Louis Comfort Tiffany Foundation Award, 2007
 Creative Capital Foundation Award, 2007
 Art Matters Foundation Grant, 2009
 Artist of the Year, Houston Art Fair, 2013
 William H. Johnson Foundation for the Arts Prize, 2013
 Idea Fund Grant, 2014
 Bemis Center for Contemporary Arts Artist In Residence, 2015
 Joan Mitchell Foundation Award, 2016

References 

1975 births
Living people
People from Houston